The 2015–16 FA Trophy Final was the 47th final of the FA Trophy. The match was contested by FC Halifax Town and Grimsby Town. Grimsby Town were beaten finalists in 2013, but it was FC Halifax Town's first final and their first visit to Wembley Stadium. For the first time the final of the FA Vase was played on the same day at the same venue, contested by Hereford and Morpeth Town. Both matches were televised in the UK on BT Sport.

FC Halifax Town defeated Tamworth, Barrow, Chester, Gateshead and Nantwich Town en route to the final.

Grimsby Town defeated Solihull Moors, Weston-super-Mare, Havant & Waterlooville, Woking, and Bognor Regis Town en route to the final.

FC Halifax Town won the match 1–0 thanks to a goal from Scott McManus after 48 minutes.

Route to the final

FC Halifax Town

Grimsby Town

Match

Details

References

FA Trophy Finals
FC Halifax Town matches
Fa Trophy Final 2016
Fa Trophy Final
Fa Trophy Final
Events at Wembley Stadium
Fa Trophy Final